Clavulina wisoli is a species of coral fungus in the family Clavulinaceae. Officially described in 2003, it is found in Africa.

References

External links

Fungi described in 2003
Fungi of Africa
wisoli
Taxa named by Ron Petersen